Elbrussky is an urban locality (an urban-type settlement) under the administrative jurisdiction of the town of republic significance of Karachayevsk in the Karachay-Cherkess Republic, Russia. As of the 2010 Census, its population was 320.

History
Urban-type settlement status was granted to Elbrussky in 1953.

Administrative and municipal status
Within the framework of administrative divisions, the urban-type settlement of Elbrussky is subordinated to the town of republic significance of Karachayevsk. Within the framework of municipal divisions, Elbrussky is a part of Karachayevsky Urban Okrug.

References

Notes

Sources

Urban-type settlements in the Karachay-Cherkess Republic